WVGA (105.9 FM) better known as "Newstalk 105.9" is a radio station broadcasting a News Talk Information format. Licensed to Lakeland, Georgia, United States, the station serves the Valdosta, Georgia area.  The station is currently owned by WVGA
.

History
The station went on the air as WHFE on November 29, 1989; on July 9, 1999, the station changed its call sign to the current WVGA.

References

External links

VGA